Baltazar Amaya (born 26 May 1999) is an Uruguayan rugby union player, currently playing for Súper Liga Americana de Rugby side Peñarol. His preferred position is wing or fullback.

Personal
Amaya attended The British Schools of Montevideo.

Professional career
Amaya signed for Súper Liga Americana de Rugby side Peñarol ahead of the 2020 Súper Liga Americana de Rugby season, before re-signing ahead of the 2021 and 2022 seasons. He has also represented the Uruguay national team.

In 2022, Amaya competed for Uruguay at the Rugby World Cup Sevens in Cape Town.

References

External links
itsrugby.co.uk Profile

1999 births
Living people
Uruguayan rugby union players
Rugby union wings
Rugby union fullbacks
Peñarol Rugby players
People educated at The British Schools of Montevideo